Yves Daniel is a French politician who was a French National Assembly deputy from 2012 to 2022.  He was elected in 2012 as a socialist, representing Loire-Atlantique's 6th constituency, defeating Michel Hunault of New Centre.
At the 2017 election, he was elected as a candidate for LREM.  He was not a candidate in 2022.

References

1954 births
Living people
Deputies of the 14th National Assembly of the French Fifth Republic
Deputies of the 15th National Assembly of the French Fifth Republic
La République En Marche! politicians
Place of birth missing (living people)
Socialist Party (France) politicians
Members of Parliament for Loire-Atlantique